José Antonio de la Hoz Uranga (born 8 January 1949) is a Spanish footballer who played as a midfielder.

Playing career
Uranga began his senior career at San Sebastián, Real Sociedad's B team, in 1970 after progressing from the youth teams. On 7 October 1972, Uranga made his debut for Sociedad, coming on as a 76th minute substitute in a 1–0 win against UD Las Palmas. In total, Uranga made 101 appearances in Sociedad's first team over the course of six years. Following his time at Sociedad, Uranga signed for Lagun Onak.

Basque nationalism

Uranga was a Basque nationalist. Prior to a Basque derby tie against Athletic Bilbao on 5 December 1976, Uranga formed a plan for both teams to exit the tunnel onto the field of play with a Basque flag, the Ikurriña. Due to the policies of Francoist Spain, the flag was still banned, despite Francisco Franco's death a year earlier. In January 1977, the flag was legalised in Spain, with Bilbao goalkeeper José Ángel Iribar stating the display "really helped" with the legalisation of the flag.

Uranga was sentenced to eight years in prison after the kidnapping of Andrés Gutiérrez Blanco in 1987 by ETA, an armed Basque separatist group. Blanco was held hostage in Getxo for 47 days, until a ransom of 190 million ₧ was paid by his family. Despite his sentence, Uranga only served six months and was later pardoned by José Luis Rodríguez Zapatero's government in January 2009.

References

1949 births
Living people
Sportspeople from Gipuzkoa
Spanish footballers
Footballers from the Basque Country (autonomous community)
Association football midfielders
Real Sociedad B footballers
Real Sociedad footballers
La Liga players
Tercera División players
ETA (separatist group) activists
Basque nationalists
People from Urola Kosta